Felger is a surname. Notable people with the surname include:

 Jay Felger, recurring Earth character in Stargate SG-1
 Michael Felger (born 1969), American sports reporter and host
  (born 1934) (Felger), botanist

See also
 Folger